Adonis Michael Thomas (born March 25, 1993) is an American professional basketball player for Stal Ostrów Wielkopolski of the Polish Basketball League (PLK). He played college basketball for the University of Memphis.

High school career
Thomas attended Melrose High School in Memphis, Tennessee. As a senior, he averaged 19.2 points, 12.3 rebounds, 4.9 blocks, 4.1 assists and 3.6 steals in helping lead Melrose to a 26–7 overall record.

College career
In his freshman season at Memphis, Thomas saw action in the first 16 games of the season before missing the next 16 contests as a result of an ankle injury (torn superior lateral peroneal tendon retinaculum) that required surgery and rehab, only managing to return to action in the postseason. In 19 games (8 starts), he averaged 8.8 points and 3.2 rebounds in 23.9 minutes per game.

In his sophomore season, Thomas was named to the 2013 All-Conference USA third team. In 36 games, he averaged 11.7 points, 4.5 rebounds and 1.9 assists per game. Memphis (31–5), which went unbeaten in the Conference USA in 2012–13 with a 16–0 mark, lost to Michigan State in the third round of the NCAA tournament.

In April 2013, Thomas signed with an agent and declared for the NBA draft, forgoing his final two years of college eligibility.

Professional career

2013–14 season
After going undrafted in the 2013 NBA draft, Thomas joined the Atlanta Hawks for the 2013 NBA Summer League. On September 30, 2013, he signed with the Hawks, only to be waived by the team on October 14 after appearing in one preseason game. Four days later, he signed with the Brooklyn Nets. However, he was waived by the Nets on October 26.

On November 1, 2013, Thomas was acquired by the Springfield Armor of the NBA Development League as an affiliate player. On February 25, 2014, he signed a 10-day contract with the Orlando Magic. On March 7, he signed a second 10-day contract with the Magic. On March 17, the Magic did not offer him a rest of season contract, and he returned to the Springfield Armor. On April 7, he signed a 10-day contract with the Philadelphia 76ers. In six NBA games during the 2013–14 season, Thomas averaged 2.3 points per game.

2014–15 season
In July 2014, Thomas joined the Brooklyn Nets for the Orlando Summer League and the Philadelphia 76ers for the Las Vegas Summer League. On September 5, 2014, he signed with the Indiana Pacers. However, he was later waived by the Pacers on October 25 after appearing in four preseason games. On November 1, he was acquired by the Grand Rapids Drive of the NBA Development League. On February 4, 2015, he was named to the Futures All-Star team for the 2015 D-League All-Star Game. In 51 games for the Drive in 2014–15, he averaged 18.9 points, 4.9 rebounds and 1.6 assists per game.

2015–16 season
On July 23, 2015, Thomas signed with the Detroit Pistons after averaging 8.6 points and 4.0 rebounds in five summer league games. Thomas suffered a calf muscle injury in the team's public scrimmage to end the first week of training camp and subsequently missed 10 days. He made his only preseason appearance against the Indiana Pacers on October 13, but he aggravated the injury after a 10-minute stint and wasn't able to return to action after that. He was later waived by the Pistons on October 23. On October 31, he returned to the Grand Rapids Drive. On December 4, he was waived by the Drive due to a season-ending wrist injury.

2016–17 season
On August 26, 2016, Thomas signed a one-year deal with Sidigas Avellino of the Lega Basket Serie A.

2017–18 season
Following the 2016–17 campaign, Thomas signed with Banvit of the Turkish Basketball Super League. He averaged 8.6 points and 3.4 rebounds per game in Turkey.

2018–19 season
On August 7, 2018, Thomas signed with Medi Bayreuth of the Basketball Bundesliga.

2019–20 season
On September 14, 2019, he has signed with BCM Gravelines-Dunkerque of the LNB Pro A.

On January 22, 2020, he has signed with Mineros de Zacatecas of the Liga Nacional de Baloncesto Profesional.

2020–21 season
On August 13, 2020, Thomas signed with BC Astana of the Kazakhstan Championship and the VTB United League.

2022–23 season
On July 28, 2022, he has signed with Stal Ostrów Wielkopolski of the Polish Basketball League (PLK).

The Basketball Tournament
In 2017, Thomas participated in The Basketball Tournament with Blue Zoo. The team lost in the first round of the tournament. The Basketball Tournament is an annual $2 million winner-take-all tournament broadcast on ESPN.

In TBT 2018, Thomas played for Team Memphis State. He averaged a team-high 18.5 points per game and 3.5 assists per game on 50 percent shooting. Team Memphis State lost in the second round to Team DRC.

NBA career statistics

Regular season

|-
| align="left" | 
| align="left" | Orlando
| 4 || 0 || 6.0 || .333 || .000 || 1.000 || .8 || .5 || .0 || .0 || 1.8
|-
| align="left" | 
| align="left" | Philadelphia
| 2 || 1 || 6.5 || .600 || .500 || – || .0 || .5 || .0 || .0 || 3.5
|-
| align="left" | Career
| align="left" |
| 6 || 1 || 6.2 || .429 || .200 || 1.000 || .5 || .5 || .0 || .0 || 2.3

References

External links

NBA D-League profile
Memphis bio

1993 births
Living people
American expatriate basketball people in France
American expatriate basketball people in Germany
American expatriate basketball people in Italy
American expatriate basketball people in Mexico
American expatriate basketball people in Turkey
American expatriate basketball people in Slovenia
American men's basketball players
Bandırma B.İ.K. players
Basketball players from Memphis, Tennessee
BC Astana players
BCM Gravelines players
Grand Rapids Drive players
KK Krka players
Lega Basket Serie A players
McDonald's High School All-Americans
Medi Bayreuth players
Memphis Tigers men's basketball players
Mineros de Zacatecas (basketball) players
Orlando Magic players
Parade High School All-Americans (boys' basketball)
Philadelphia 76ers players
S.S. Felice Scandone players
Stal Ostrów Wielkopolski players
Small forwards
Springfield Armor players
Undrafted National Basketball Association players